Arqba is the tenth month of the Mandaean calendar.

It is the Mandaic name for the constellation Scorpio. It currently corresponds to Apr / May in the Gregorian calendar due to a lack of a leap year in the Mandaean calendar.

References

Months of the Mandaean calendar
Scorpio in astrology
Scorpions in culture